Hyphodermella corrugata is a species of crust fungus in the family Phanerochaetaceae, and the type species of genus Hyphodermella.

References

Fungal plant pathogens and diseases
Phanerochaetaceae
Taxa named by Elias Magnus Fries
Fungi described in 1874